Coelogyne rumphii is a species of orchid.

rumphii